Jukebox is an album by the Danish composer Bent Fabricius-Bjerre under his Bent Fabric alias. It was released on 19 April 2004 on Universal. The album is co-written with a wide range of Danish pop musicians such as Paw Lagermann and Lina Rafn of Infernal, Remee, Martin Brygmann, and Søren Rasted of Aqua.

Track listing

Danish edition

US edition

Credits and personnel
The following information are taken from the US edition.

References

External links
Jukebox at Discogs

2004 albums
Bent Fabric albums
Universal Music Denmark albums
Hidden Beach Recordings albums